The Quebec Central Railway  was a railway in the Canadian province of Quebec, that served the Eastern Townships region south of the St. Lawrence River. Its headquarters was in Sherbrooke. It was originally incorporated in 1869 as the Sherbrooke, Eastern Townships and Kennebec Railway, and changed its name to the Quebec Central Railway in 1875. In 1894, it built a line southward to Mégantic to connect to Canadian Pacific Railway's east-west line, the International Railway of Maine. In 1912, the Canadian Pacific Railway leased the Quebec Central for 99 years but continued to operate as Quebec Central Railway, including passenger service to American cities. The Quebec Central in turn leased the Massawippi Valley Railway, a short line from Lennoxville to Newport, in 1926; this allowed passenger service from Quebec City via Sherbrooke to the United States.

The company operated passenger trains on several long and short routes. Its longest route travelled from Quebec City to Sherbrooke, to then to Newport, Vermont. There, passengers could transfer to Boston and Maine trains, Alouette or Red Wing bound for Boston, Massachusetts. Branch sections from the latter served passengers bound for Portland, Maine. The Boston & Maine and the New York, New Haven and Hartford Railroad operated the Connecticut Yankee from New York City's Grand Central Terminal, up Connecticut River Valley, to Newport and along Quebec Central territory to Sherbrooke and Montreal.

Passenger service ended in April 1967, and freight service ended in November 1994. The Massawippi line's track was entirely removed in 1992. The Quebec Central was abandoned on December 23, 1994. However, because the CPR only owned 10% of the Quebec Central's stock, it could not tear up the track and dispose of the right-of-way. In December 1999, a local resident who owned a trucking company (Express Marco Incorporated) bought the railway from the CPR and revived it, with trains running starting in June 2000. The railway operated tourist excursions in addition to regular freight service.  However, the company went out of business in 2006 once more ending railway traffic on the line. The remaining portions of the line currently belong to the Ministère des Transports du Québec.

Locomotive roster

References

Bibliography

External links 

 

Defunct Quebec railways
Companies based in Sherbrooke